Journey: A Quest for Galactic Power is a 1980 board game published by Grenadier Models.

Gameplay
Journey is one of Grenadier's "Great Little Game Line" series, in which ships from two to four contending worlds are attempting to get to the Epsilon Cygni II system to pick up a supply of much-needed plienthium mangate.

Reception
Tony Watson reviewed Journey in The Space Gamer No. 31. Watson commented that "Despite the interesting use of cards, I can't find much to recommend in this game. Most gamers will tire of it quickly, and the price [...] would be much better spent, in terms of play value, in picking up two or three of the various Micros and capsule-format games on the market."

External Links

References

Board games introduced in 1980